The history of the many lightvessel stations of Great Britain goes back over 250 years to the placement of the world's first lightship at the Nore in the early 18th century.

A lightvessel station is a named position at which a lightvessel was placed, rather than a particular ship; individual vessels were often transferred between different stations during their existence. Stations themselves were occasionally changed, especially during wartime, when lights were only displayed in response to specific shipping needs.

History

The world's first lightvessel was the result of a business partnership between Robert Hamblin, a former barber and ship manager from King's Lynn, and David Avery, an investor. In 1730 the pair secured a government licence to moor a ship, with a prominent light affixed to it, to serve as a navigation aid at the Nore in the Thames mouth. Hamblin and Avery intended to profit from the vessel by collecting a fee from passing merchant vessels. The licence was opposed by Trinity House, which considered that it possessed a monopoly on construction and maintenance of navigation aids in British waters. After extensive legal dispute the licence was revoked in 1732 and Trinity House assumed direct responsibility for the proposed lightship; Hamblin and Avery were granted nominal lease revenues in exchange. The Nore lightship commenced operations in 1734.

A second lightvessel was placed at the Dudgeon station, off the Norfolk coast, in 1736, with others following at Owers Bank (1788) and the Goodwin Sands (1793). While the Admiralty opposed the 1802 Sunk lightvessel, claiming it would aid enemy ships, it soon afterwards placed three vessels of its own  to protect the fleet during the Napoleonic Wars; they were taken over by Trinity House a few years later. Many others were commissioned during the nineteenth century, especially off England's east coast and the approaches to the Thames, where there were many treacherous shoals.

Following their acquisition of the Admiralty ships, all English and Welsh lightvessels were maintained by Trinity House, with the exception of the four vessels in the approaches to the River Mersey, which were maintained by the Mersey Docks and Harbour Board until 1973, and those in the Humber Estuary, which were the responsibility of the Humber Conservancy Board.

Communications and safety

Communication with lightvessels proved to be a major problem for Trinity House; lightvessel crews were well-placed to observe ships in distress, but could not always alert lifeboats on shore. After a series of shipwrecks, an experiment was conducted whereby a nine-mile undersea cable was run from the Sunk lightvessel in the Thames Estuary to the post office at Walton-on-the-Naze. This was intended to commence in 1884, but was plagued by delays; the trial was unsuccessful as the cable repeatedly broke. 

As a result of a motion brought forward by Sir Edward Birkbeck, a Royal Commission was established to look at the issue of 'electrical communication' and gave its first Report in 1892; the East Goodwin lightvessel was used during one of Guglielmo Marconi's early experiments in radio transmission in 1896. The world's first radio distress signal was transmitted by the East Goodwin lightvessel's radio operator on 17 March 1899, after the merchant vessel Elbe ran aground on the Goodwins, while on 30 April that year, the East Goodwin vessel transmitted a distress signal on its own behalf, when the SS R. F. Matthews rammed it in a dense fog. Safety was further improved by the development of more powerful lamps and through the replacement by foghorns of the gongs previously used as fog signals.

Crew

Until the second half of the 20th century, all Trinity House vessels were permanently manned. An 1861 article in the Cornhill Magazine described lightshipmen as being paid 55 shillings a month (in addition to drawing 1 shilling and sixpence a week "in lieu of 3 gallons of small-beer"): the vessels were supplied, and the crews relieved, once a month. It was also noted that "a general tone of decent, orderly and superior conduct" was observed, that the men were "very respectable [...] swearing and profane language are [...] prohibited" and that every man was supplied with a Bible as well as "a library of varied and entertaining literature".

By the start of the 20th century, Trinity House lightvessels had a crew of 11, of whom seven (a master and six ratings) would be on active duty at any one time. It was an extremely demanding and dangerous profession, and it would take 15 to 20 years of service to be promoted to master.

Replacement

The majority of British lightvessels were decommissioned during the 1970s - 1980s and replaced with light floats or LANBY buoys, which were vastly cheaper to maintain: in 1974 at the time of Trinity House's original development project, lightship annual running costs at £30,000 were ten times those of the LANBY.

The remaining UK lightvessels have now been converted to unmanned operation and most now use solar power.

Vessels

Unlike lightships in the United States and other parts of the world, Trinity House lightvessels were usually unpowered and needed to be towed to or from their position. In order to act as effective daymarks they were painted red, with the station name in large white letters on the side of the hull, and a system of balls and cones at the masthead for identification. The first revolving light was fitted to the Swin Middle lightvessel in 1837: others used occulting or flashing lights. White lights were preferred for visibility though red and very occasionally green (as with the Mouse lightvessel) were also used.

It is likely that photographs on various websites showing named lightvessels, may appear to be structurally different to comparable records on other web pages due to the fact that the particular vessel might have been withdrawn from a station after photographing and being towed away for drydocking, overhaul and possible direction to a new station and therefore a different lightvessel would have been substituted at the named station on withdrawal of the previous lightvessel. This has been most evident on those vessels that have been withdrawn and shipped to another port at home or abroad to become a floating museum, floating restaurant, 'clubhouse', etc. Scarweather LV and Helwick LV have for instance changed their rôle in their lifetime and their appearance on various records varies considerably.

England

Active stations

The following are active stations at which Trinity House still maintains unmanned lightships, which also act as weather stations.

Former stations

Scotland, Isle of Man

Lightvessels in Scotland and the Isle of Man were maintained by the Northern Lighthouse Board, with the exception of those maintained by the Clyde Lighthouse Trust and by the Dundee Port Trustees. Of the NLB vessels, only the North Carr was crewed.

Wales

Former Welsh lightships were maintained by Trinity House. Remaining substitute navigational aids still are.

Helwick (off Worms Head)
Milford Haven Lightvessel
Scarweather (Swansea Bay; replaced with buoy 1989)
St Gowan (off Pembrokeshire coast). The station once carried the name St Govan, i.e., spelling change

See also
List of lightvessels of Great Britain
List of lighthouses in the United Kingdom
Lightvessels in Ireland
Trinity House
Men of the Lightship
Light float

References

External links

 
Lightship stations